The 2019 cycling season began in Australia at the Tour Down Under for Team Sky in January.

As a UCI WorldTeam, they are automatically invited and obliged to send a squad to every event in the UCI World Tour.

Effective 1 May 2019 the team became known as Team Ineos.

2019 roster

Riders who joined the team for the 2019 season

Riders who left the team during or after the 2018 season

Season victories

National, Continental and World champions

Footnotes

References

External links
 

2019 in British sport
2019 road cycling season by team
Ineos Grenadiers